Morten Jensen (born December 2, 1982 in Lynge) is a Danish former track and field athlete. He specialised in long jump and also competed in the 100 metres and 200 metres sprints. He holds the Danish record in the long jump and formerly held the national records in the 100 metres and indoor 200 metres.

He competed at the World Championships in Athletics in 2005 and 2007, the 2006 World Indoor Championships, the 2006 European Championships, the 2007 World Championships and the 2008 Olympic Games without qualifying for the final round.

He was runner-up in the 2010 Finnish Elite Games rankings, just missing out to Levern Spencer for that year's jackpot.

He has been a part of the Sparta team since 2005, before then he was a part of FIF Hillerød. His coach was Leif Dahlberg after the 2010 European Championships he changed to Lars Nielsen and Anders Møller.

International competitions
All results regarding long jump, unless stated otherwise

Personal bests
 100 metres: 10.29 s (2004) 
 200 metres: 20.75 s (2004)
 Long jump: 8.25 m (2005)

See also
List of European Athletics Indoor Championships medalists (men)
List of 100 metres national champions (men)
List of 200 metres national champions (men)

References

dafital profile

1982 births
Living people
Danish male long jumpers
Danish male sprinters
Olympic athletes of Denmark
Athletes (track and field) at the 2008 Summer Olympics
World Athletics Championships athletes for Denmark
People from Allerød Municipality
Sportspeople from the Capital Region of Denmark